Hercules Collins (died 1702), was an English Baptist minister, author of a revision of the Heidelberg Catechism called the Orthodox Catechism.

Life
Collins had little education, but was religious at an early age. He appears to have officiated to a congregation at Wapping, and at one period he was imprisoned in Newgate Prison. He died on 4 October 1702, and his funeral sermon, by the Rev. John Piggott, was printed in the following year.

Works
His published material begins with An Orthodox Catechism (1680), an edited version of the 16th century Heidelberg Catechism. Collins revised the section on baptism, as well as making a number of stylistic changes; he also added the text of the Nicene Creed and Athanasian Creed. In the appendix Collins argues for the biblical duty of congregational singing.

Over the next twenty-two years Collins produced eleven more works, mainly on issues of separation from the Church of England, and believer's baptism versus infant baptism. Other works come from his time in Newgate Prison during 1684. One of these was Counsel for the Living Occasioned from the Dead and was written on the death of two of his fellow prisoners; it contains pastoral instruction to those who were likewise experiencing persecution. The other, A Voice from Prison, was alternatively titled: Meditations on Revelation 3:11 Tending to the Establishment of God’s Little Flock, in An Hour of Temptation.

A final work was The Temple Repair'd. It includes instruction on preparing and preaching sermons for those in the ministry.

Besides some single sermons, he wrote the following works, some of which occasioned a good deal of controversy:
 An Orthodox Catechism, being the sum of Christian Religion contained in the Law and Gospel, London, 1680, 12mo.
 A Voice from the Prison, or Meditations on Revelations, London, 1684, 4to.
 Believers' Baptism from Heaven, and of Divine Institution Infants' Baptism from Earth, and Human Invention, London, 1691, 8vo., revised and republished by John Bailey, London, 1803, 8vo.
 The Antidote proved a Counterfeit, or Error detected, and Believers' Baptism vindicated, containing an answer to "An Antidote to prevent the Prevalency of Anabaptism," London, 1693, 4to.
 Three books, viz. I. The Scribe instructed unto the Kingdom of Heaven. II. Mountains of Brass, or a Discourse upon the Decrees of God. III. A poem on the Birth, Life, Death, Resurrection, and Ascension of Jesus Christ. 3 parts, London, 1696, 12mo.

His collected Works are presently being edited by Mark Smith and Reagan Marsh for Hesed & Emet Publishers (H&E) under the oversight of Dr. Michael Haykin.

References

External links
 http://www.angelfire.com/tn/steveweaver/17th_Century_Baptist_Ministry.pdf
 https://www.chapellibrary.org/book/mobr/

Attribution

Year of birth unknown
1702 deaths
17th-century English Baptist ministers
17th-century English writers
17th-century English male writers
18th-century English non-fiction writers
18th-century English male writers
18th-century English writers
English religious writers